Kapar Judaki (also Romanized as Kapar Jūdakī; also known as Kapar and Khāpār) is a village in Shirvan Rural District, in the Central District of Borujerd County, Lorestan Province, Iran. At the 2006 census, its population was 355, in 89 families.

References 

Towns and villages in Borujerd County